Lac du Lachtelweiher is a lake in Haut-Rhin, France. At an elevation of 740 m, its surface area is 0.015 km². The French name is a tautology as the German Weiher already means pond/lake.

Lakes of Haut-Rhin